Avre may refer to:

 Avre (Eure), a river in northwestern France, tributary of the Eure
 Avre (Somme), a river in northern France, tributary of the Somme

See also
 AVRE, Armoured Vehicle Royal Engineers